The 1996 Illinois Fighting Illini football team represented the University of Illinois at Urbana–Champaign during the 1996 NCAA Division I-A football season. They participated as members of the Big Ten Conference. Their home games were played at Memorial Stadium in Champaign, Illinois. The team's head coach was Lou Tepper, who was fired as head coach of the Illini after the end of the season.  Illinois had a record of 2–9 and failed to make a bowl game.

Schedule

Roster

References

Illinois
Illinois Fighting Illini football seasons
Illinois Fighting Illini football